The William H. Donner was an American Great Lakes freighter that was built in 1914 by the Great Lakes Engineering Works of Ashtabula, Ohio for service on the Great Lakes of North America. She was used to transport bulk cargoes such as iron ore, coal, grain and occasionally limestone. She operated from 1914 as a bulk carrier to 1970 when she was converted to a floating crane ship with two cranes. In order to facilitate better maintenance most of the ship's superstructure was eventually removed. It remained in service until 2016, when it was deemed obsolete to requirements. In 2020, the vessel, which consisted of only the hull and minus the cranes, was finally sold for scrap. It was towed on December 17 from Marinette Wisconsin to the Purvis Scrap Yard in Soo, Ontario Canada above the Soo Locks. The dismantling process will begin sometime in early 2021.

History

The Donner was launched on May 7, 1914 as hull number #134. She had a length of 524-feet, a beam of 54-feet and a height of 30-feet. She was built using the Isherwood System of longitudinal construction of ships, powered by a 1,900 horsepower triple expansion steam engine and fueled by two coal-fired Scotch marine boilers. She had the official number U.S. #212354. She was commissioned by the Mahonig Steamship Company ( M.A. Hanna & Co., Mgr.) of Cleveland, Ohio. Her homeport was Fairport, Ohio. She entered service on July 7, 1914 clearing Ecorse, Michigan bound for Cleveland, Ohio.

In 1929 the Donner was transferred to the Bethlehem Transportation Corporation's Ore Steamship Company (H.K. Oakes, Mgr.) of Cleveland. In 1955 she was re-registered to Wilmington, Delaware. In 1956 she was converted to a crane ship with two revolving cranes by the American Ship Building Company of Toledo, Ohio.

In 1970 the Donner was sold to the Miller Compressing Company of Milwaukee, Wisconsin for use as a freight transfer vessel at Milwaukee. In 1992 she was sold to K & K Warehousing and towed to Menominee, Michigan, then later to Marinette, Wisconsin to again serve as a freight transfer vessel.

In 2002 the Donner's pilothouse was removed. The final retirement of the old vessel came in March 2016 - after 102 years of service - when she was towed to the Menominee River and moored to await scrapping. The scrap tow was conducted in December 2020.

References

Ships powered by a triple expansion steam engine
1914 ships
Great Lakes freighters
Merchant ships of the United States
Steamships of the United States
Ships built in Ashtabula, Ohio